Noli me tangere is an oil on canvas painting by Andrea del Sarto, executed c. 1510, depicting Jesus and Mary Magdalene soon after the resurrection. It was the first painting he produced for the Augustinian San Gallo church in Florence, as recorded by Anonimo Magliabechiano and in Vasari's Lives of the Artists, and he later produced the San Gallo Annunciation and The Disputation on the Trinity for the same church. It is now in the Uffizi.

Noli was commissioned by Leonardo Morelli, as shown by a papal brief of 9 April 1532. During the siege of Florence the monastery's artworks were moved within the city walls to San Jacopo tra i Fossi. The original church outside the walls was razed by Charles V's troops in 1531, but all its chapels were reconstructed at San Jacopo, with Noli ending up in the Morelli chapel. About a third of the painting was underwater during a flood in 1557. The original predella is lost, probably after being damaged in the flood, and replaced by a new one in the late 16th century - the new predella was later removed and is now in the Casa Vasari museum in Arezzo.

The church was suppressed and turned into a barracks in 1849, upon which the Morelli family took back the painting, on the condition that it would remain on public display. However, they did not meet this condition and in 1875 the Italian state took legal action to confiscate the painting, exhibiting it at the Uffizi. Temporarily placed in the museum's stores, the Uffizi's Florentine galleries were reorganised and the work was reassigned to the Museo del Cenacolo di Andrea del Sarto, also in Florence. It remained there until early 2013, when it was returned to the Uffizi upon the redisplay of the latter's Sala di Michelangelo.

References

Paintings in the collection of the Uffizi
Andrea del Sarto
Paintings by Andrea del Sarto
1510 paintings